Izbat Shufa is a Palestinian town in the Tulkarm Governorate in the eastern West Bank, located Southeast of Tulkarm.

References

External links
Welcome To Izbet Shufa
Survey of Western Palestine, Map 11:    IAA, Wikimedia commons

Villages in the West Bank
Municipalities of the State of Palestine